Kostków  (Kostkiv) is a village in the administrative district of Gmina Jarosław, within Jarosław County, Subcarpathian Voivodeship, in south-eastern Poland.

References

Villages in Jarosław County